Salifu is a Ghanaian name that may refer to
Given name
Salifu Saeed, Ghanaian politician 

Surname
Ameen Salifu, Ghanaian politician 
Amidu Salifu (born 1992), Ghanaian football midfielder 
Imoru Salifu, Ghanaian politician
Latif Salifu (born 1990), Ghanaian football player
Mary Salifu Boforo (born 1951), Ghanaian Member of Parliament 
Razak Salifu (born 1988), Ghanaian football midfielder
Seidu Salifu (born 1993), Ghanaian football player
Edward Braimah Salifu Major General, Ghana Armed Forces (1937-2013)
Fawzy Salifu(musician, born 1999), Ghanaian